Centennial Olympic Stadium was the 85,000-seat main stadium of the 1996 Summer Olympics and Paralympics in Atlanta, Georgia, United States. Construction of the stadium began in 1993, and it was complete and ready for the opening ceremony in July 1996, where it hosted track and field events and the closing ceremony. After the Olympics and Paralympics, it was reconstructed into the baseball-specific Turner Field, used by the Atlanta Braves of Major League Baseball for 20 seasons (1997–2016). After the Braves departed for Truist Park, the facility was purchased by Georgia State University, which rebuilt the stadium a second time as Center Parc Stadium, designed for American football.

History

During the week-long athletics program, the stadium bore witness to Donovan Bailey of Canada winning the 100 m in a world record time of 9.84 s; Michael Johnson winning both the 200 and 400 metres titles, breaking the 200 m world record in the process; and France's Marie-José Pérec also winning the 200/400 double. Meanwhile, Carl Lewis won his fourth consecutive Olympic title in the long jump, becoming only the second person, after Al Oerter, to win the same athletics event at four consecutive Games.

After the closing ceremony of the 1996 Paralympics, the stadium was officially leased by the Atlanta Braves. Private entities, including NBC and other Olympic sponsors, agreed to pay a large sum of the cost to build Centennial Olympic Stadium (approximately $170 million of the $209 million bill). The Atlanta Committee for the Olympic Games (ACOG) sought to build the stadium in a way that it could be converted to a new baseball stadium, and ACOG paid for the conversion. This was considered a good agreement for both the Olympic Committee and the Braves, because there would be no use for a permanent 85,000 seat track and field stadium in Downtown Atlanta since the 71,000 seat Georgia Dome had been completed four years earlier by the state of Georgia and became the home of the National Football League's Atlanta Falcons. The Braves had already been exploring opportunities for a new venue to replace Atlanta–Fulton County Stadium. 

The southwest corner of the Olympic Stadium was built to accommodate the future baseball infield and seating; in the Olympic configuration of the stadium, the seats are not placed next to the oval running track. The southwest part of the stadium also had four tiers of seats, luxury boxes, a facade facing the street, and a roof, whereas the north half of the stadium used a simpler two-tiered seating configuration. During reconstruction, the athletics track was removed and relocated to the field hockey stadium located at Clark Atlanta University, which uses it for athletics and football, and the north half of the stadium was demolished, reducing the capacity to 49,000. Because of the need to fit a track within the stadium in its earlier incarnation, the field of play, particularly foul territory, while not large by historical standards, was nonetheless larger than that of most MLB stadiums built since 1990. Reconstruction was complete in 1997, and the facility was renamed Turner Field. Afterward, Atlanta–Fulton County Stadium, the Braves' previous home and the venue for the Olympics baseball events, was imploded and the site became a parking lot for Turner Field. The Atlanta Fulton County Recreation Authority owned Turner Field, and the Atlanta Braves occupied the revised stadium until the expiration of their lease in 2016; the Braves moved to Truist Park in Cobb County in the following year. Georgia State University acquired Turner Field and its surrounding parking lots in January 2017 for a mixed use expansion of the Georgia State campus, which includes private and student housing, academic, retail, and office space in addition to the redevelopment of the former ballpark into Center Parc Stadium. 

The Atlanta Track Club's annual Father's Day four-mile (6.4 km) road race ends inside the stadium near the warning track where the finish line was located for the Olympics.

References

External links

Interactive diagram at Clem's Baseball site showing both Olympic and Braves configurations
Aerial View of Olympic Stadium
Reconstruction into Baseball Stadium
1996 Summer Games

Atlanta
Athletics (track and field) venues in Georgia (U.S. state)
Venues of the 1996 Summer Olympics
Olympic athletics venues
Defunct athletics (track and field) venues in the United States
Sports venues in Atlanta
1996 establishments in Georgia (U.S. state)
1997 disestablishments in Georgia (U.S. state)
Defunct sports venues in Georgia (U.S. state)
Sports venues completed in 1996